Alibag, also known as Alibaug (Pronunciation: [əlibaːɡ]), is a coastal town and a municipal council in Raigad district of Maharashtra, India. It is the headquarters of the Raigad district and is south of the city of Mumbai. Alibag is part of the Mumbai Metropolitan Region and is situated at a distance of about 96 km from Mumbai and 143 km from Pune. Alibag is a holy place for Goddess Shree Padmakshi Renuka, and thousands of people go there to worship every day.
she also known as goddess of konkan

History

Alibag and its surrounding villages are the historic hinterlands of Bene Israel Jews. According to Indian Jewish historian Esther David, Jews arrived in the region over 2000 years ago, escaping persecution from the Roman Empire, when their ship wrecked here. As they got into the business of oil-pressing and plantations, continued practising Sabbath and took holidays on Saturday, they came to be known as 'Shanvar-telis' There is a synagogue named 'Magen Aboth synagogue' in the "Israel Alley" (Marathi इस्राएल आळी meaning Israel lane) area of the town.

Revdanda, Chaul, Nagaon, Akshi, Varsoli, Thal, Navgaon, Kihim, and Aawas villages were known as "Ashtagare".

After retirement, Kanhoji Angre the Grand Admiral of the Maratha Navy settled and spent his last days in Alibag.

Etymology
A wealthy Bene Israelite named Eli (Elisha/Elizah) used to live there at that time and owned many plantations of mangoes and coconuts in his gardens. Hence the natives used to call the place "Eli cha Bagh" and in the subsequent generations pronunciation changed to simply "Alibag", and the name stuck.

Geography
The average elevation is 0 metres (0 feet).The District Government offices are located along the sea coast road. Alibag is the center place of Raigad District.

Demographics
 India census, Alibag had a population of 19,491. Males constitute 52% of the population and females 48%. Alibag has an average literacy rate of 79%, higher than the national average of 59.5%; with 54% of the males and 46% of females literate. 11% of the population is under 6 years of age. 75% of the population speaks the Marathi language.

As of the 2011 census, Alibag town had a population of 20,743, of which 10,646 are males while 10,097 are females, and 17,431 were educated, with a literacy rate of 84%.

The population of children ages 0–6 is 1833, which is 8.84% of the total population of Alibag.

Climate

Cyclones
In November 2009 Cyclone Phyan made landfall in the city. Massive damage to property was reported in the districts of Ratnagiri, Raigad, Sindhudurg, Thane and Palghar. In Navi Mumbai, the 7th one-day international cricket match between India and Australia was abandoned after Cyclone Phyan brought heavy rain to Mumbai. Eleven years later, in early June 2020, severe cyclonic storm Nisarga made landfall in Alibag at peak intensity. The cyclone blew off tin and asbestos sheets from roofs and uprooted trees in Alibag, Mumbai, Thane, Navi Mumbai and Pune. Several trees fell on houses.

Places of Interest

Historical

 Kolaba Fort, an old fortified maritime base which was the naval headquarters of the Maratha ruler Shivaji, and was used to launch raids on British ships.
 'Kanhoji Angre Samadhi', the memorial to Maratha Admiral Kanhoji Angre

 Hirakot fort, built by Kanhoji Angre in 1720

Religious
 Kalambika Mandir, temple built by Kanhoji Angre
 Balaji Mandir, temple to Lord Shri Balaji or Shri Venkateshwar (an avatar of lord Shri Vishnu), built in 1788.
 'Magen Aboth synagogue' in the 'Israel Alley' area of the town

Scientific
Alibag houses a magnetic observatory that was set up in 1904. It serves as one of the significant observatories forming part of a global network now run by Indian Institute of Geomagnetism. The observatory has two buildings; the first building has magnetometers that record changes occurring in the geomagnetic fields. The second building consists of precision recording instruments, which give data about geomagnetic storms caused by solar storms which are shared with other countries.

Transport

Road
One can reach Alibag via Pen (30 km), which is on the Mumbai (108 km) – Goa road. From Mumbai, one can reach Alibag by traveling on the Mumbai-Goa highway (NH-66) till Wadkhal (or Vadkhal) and taking the right fork from Wadkhal to continue on (NH-166A)– the left fork being the road to Goa. It is approximately 108 km from Mumbai.

Railways
The nearest rail railway station is at Pen. Through Pen, it is connected to Panvel and onward to Mumbai and the Indian Railways network. Now Pen-Panvel trains are also started from 4 November 2018 now it is easier to reach Alibag.

Boat services
The nearest jetty is Mandwa, from where catamaran/ferry services are available to the Gateway of India, Mumbai. Another port in the vicinity is Rewas, from where a ferry service is available to Ferry Wharf (Bhau cha Dhakka) (Dockyard Road). There is a jetty at Custom Bandar from where fishermen in Alibag set sail.

One can reach Alibag by catamaran through Gateway of India to Mandwa or from Bhaucha Dhakka to Rewas and from Mandwa/Rewas to Alibag by bus. The ticket includes the trip from the Gateway to Mandwa and the bus trip from Mandwa to Alibag bus stop. The well-known operators of these catamarans are PNP, Maldar, and Ajanta, and tickets can be purchased at their booth at the Gateway of India. From Rewas to Alibag, one needs to take a State Transport bus or a rickshaw. Take the ferry from Gateway to Mandwa. Services are usually available from 6:00 am to 6:00 pm. The trip takes 40 to 55  minutes depending on the type of boat. From Mandwa operators carry passengers to Alibag in their own chartered buses. The bus journey time is 45  minutes. Alibag beach is within walking distance from the bus stop.

Another option is to take a ferry from "Bhaucha Dhakka" to Rewas. Timings are the same but the schedule may change depending on the tide. From Rewas take the state transport bus or rickshaw to Alibag.

Speedboats from the Gateway of India to Mandwa Jetty take roughly 20–25 minutes depending on the weather and can be hired at the Gateway of India at Jetty No. 5 opposite the Taj Mahal Hotel. The new jetty installed in 2014 at Mandwa ensures the safety of guests travelling by speedboat.

There is a Ro-Ro service now in place from Ferry Wharf to Mandwa from where Alibag is a 30-minute drive. The ferry ride takes an hour

Air
The nearest airport is in Mumbai which is 140 km away by road. Alibag has no airport. Navi Mumbai International Airport, scheduled to start operation in 2024, is under construction approximately 57 km from Alibag.

Notable people
Notable people born in Alibag include:

 Kanhoji Angre - Indian admiral, Maratha Navy's Chief (18th-century India)
 Ashwini Bhave - Indian actress
 Devdatta Nage - Indian actor
 Nana Patekar - Celebrated film actor and writer
 Sanjay Raut - Indian journalist & politician
 Ramesh Tendulkar - Noted marathi poet and Sachin Tendulkar's father
 Adesh Bandekar - Marathi actor, politician
 Arun Shridhar Vaidya - 13th Chief of the Army Staff (India)
 Mugdha Vaishampayan - Indian singer
 Nanasaheb Dharmadhikari - Indian spiritual Guru
 Mukri - Indian actor

Education 
Alibag has a new Government Medical College towards education for medical students in the district. There was a growing need for medical education as else students had to go away from there district. Furthermore, the medical college helps in the need for the district medical vacancies for the local population, which would otherwise bruden the major hospitals elsewhere. This medical college started in year 2022.

 Government Medical College

References

External links

Konkan
Bene Israel
Populated coastal places in India
Beaches of Maharashtra
Talukas in Maharashtra
Cities and towns in Raigad district